Vittsjö Gymnastik- och Idrottsklubb is a football club from Vittsjö, Sweden. They play in the highest level of women's soccer leagues in Sweden, the Damallsvenskan.

Vittsjö GIK play their home games at Vittsjö IP Stadium in Vittsjö, a 1,500 capacity stadium completed in April 2012.

Current squad

Former players
For details of former players, see :Category:Vittsjö GIK players.

References

External links
 Official website 

 
Vittsjo GIK
Damallsvenskan teams
Association football clubs established in 1933
1933 establishments in Sweden